G1/S-specific cyclin-D2 is a protein that in humans is encoded by the CCND2 gene.

Function 

The protein encoded by this gene belongs to the highly conserved cyclin family, whose members are characterized by a dramatic periodicity in protein abundance through the cell cycle. Cyclins function as regulators of cyclin-dependent kinases. Different cyclins exhibit distinct expression and degradation patterns which contribute to the temporal coordination of each mitotic event. This cyclin forms a complex with and functions as a regulatory subunit of CDK4 or CDK6, whose activity is required for cell cycle G1/S transition. This protein has been shown to interact with and be involved in the phosphorylation of tumor suppressor protein Rb. Knockout studies of the homologous gene in mouse suggest the essential roles of this gene in ovarian granulosa and germ cell proliferation. High level expression of this gene was observed in ovarian and testicular tumors.

Clinical significance 

Mutations in  CCND2 are associated to megalencephaly-polymicrogyria-polydactyly-hydrocephalus syndrome.

References

Further reading

External links